Langholm Rugby Football Club are a rugby union team founded in 1871. They play their home games at Milntown, Langholm, Dumfries and Galloway.

The team currently play in the East Regional League Division Two following relegation from East Regional League Division One at the end of the 2014–15 season.

Langholm Sevens

The Langholm Sevens tournament is hosted by the club.  It held around the end of April each year and is part of the Borders Sevens Circuit. The tournament first started in 1908.

Notable former players
 Tom Scott,  and president of the Scottish Football Union from 1918 to 1920
 Ernie Michie, British and Irish Lions, Barbarian F.C.
 Christy Elliot, 1958
 Donald Scott, 1950
 Tommy Elliot, 1968
 Chuck Muir, 1997 Scottish Football Union International Referee
 Ally Ratcliffe (née Little), 2000 & Scottish Football Union Hall of Fame Inductee 2021
 Jilly McCord, 2004
 Lisa Thomson, 2017

Honours

 Scottish Unofficial Championship
 Champions (1): 1958-59
 Border League
 Champions (1): 1958-59
 Langholm Sevens
 Champions (1): 1959
 Kelso Sevens
 Champions (1): 1953
 Hawick Sevens
 Champions (1): 1899
 Gala Sevens
 Champions (2): 1951, 1955
 Earlston Sevens
 Champions (1): 1954
 Selkirk Sevens
 Champions (2): 1949, 1958
 Ardrossan Sevens
 Champions (2): 1963, 1968

See also

 Langholm
 Border League
 Borders Sevens Circuit

References

Sources
 Bath, Richard (ed.) The Complete Book of Rugby (Seven Oaks Ltd, 1997 )
 Godwin, Terry Complete Who's Who of International Rugby (Cassell, 1987)
 McLaren, Bill Talking of Rugby (1991, Stanley Paul, London )
 Massie, Allan A Portrait of Scottish Rugby (Polygon, Edinburgh)

Scottish rugby union teams
Rugby clubs established in 1871
1871 establishments in Scotland
Rugby union clubs in the Scottish Borders
Rugby union in Dumfries and Galloway
Langholm